The South-East Scotland Transport Partnership (branded SESTran) is a statutory regional transport partnership in Scotland.

SESTran covers most of South East and Central Scotland, and includes the following Local Authorities: 
 Fife
 East Lothian
 Midlothian
 West Lothian
 Edinburgh
 Scottish Borders
 Falkirk and
 Clackmannanshire

Functions
SESTRAN is an independent organisation that is tasked with improving local transport in the South East of Scotland. It is governed by a joint board, where around two-thirds of members are local councillors from affiliated  councils, with the remainder made up of business and industry professionals. It was first tasked with producing a regional development strategy and delivery plan to set out what projects would be delivered, such as improving park and ride sites and real-time information displays on Edinburgh's bus network.

References

Transport in Scotland
Regional Transport Partnerships in Scotland